Nifty may refer to:

 Nifty Corporation, a Japanese internet service provider
 Nifty magazine, a high fashion magazine
 Nifty Copper Mine, Western Australia
 Nifty Airport, Western Australia
 Nifty Theatre, Waterville, Washington, United States, on the National Register of Historic Places
 nickname of Rick Middleton (born 1953), Canadian retired National Hockey League player
 Mr. Nifty, a neighbour of The Beano comic book character Gordon Bennett
 Nifty Fifty, a colloquial term for the strong earning blue chip stocks on the New York Stock Exchange in the 1970s
 NIFTY 50, an index for large cap stocks on the National Stock Exchange of India
 Honda Spree, a 1980s motor scooter also known as the Nifty 50
 Network for Teaching Entrepreneurship (NFTE), pronounced "Nifty", an international non-profit organization providing training to low-income young people
 Nifty Erotic Stories Archive, an online repository of alternative erotica